Bally Sports Ohio is an American regional sports network owned by Sinclair Broadcast Group and is operated as an affiliate of Bally Sports. The channel broadcasts regional coverage of sports events in the state of Ohio, with a focus on professional sports teams based in Cleveland and Cincinnati, which are broadcast on separate programming feeds, as well as Columbus.

Bally Sports Ohio is available on cable providers throughout Ohio, as well as parts of Indiana, Kentucky, northwestern Pennsylvania, eastern Tennessee, border communities of West Virginia, and extreme southwestern New York; it is also available nationwide on satellite via DirecTV.

History

The channel originally launched on February 9, 1989, as SportsChannel Ohio. It launched as an affiliate of SportsChannel, a slate of regional sports networks operated as a joint venture between Cablevision and NBC. SportsChannel Ohio initially held the broadcast games from the Cleveland Cavaliers and the Cleveland Indians. The channel also aired select Cincinnati Reds games produced by SportsChannel Cincinnati, Notre Dame Fighting Irish basketball and football games, and Ohio State Buckeyes sporting events (with the exception of football and basketball).

In 1997, News Corporation and Liberty Media purchased a 40% interest in Cablevision's sports properties including the SportsChannel America networks (as well as Madison Square Garden and its NBA and NHL team tenants, the New York Knicks and New York Rangers) in a deal worth $850 million, forming the venture National Sports Partners to run the owned-and-operated regional networks. As part of a gradual rebranding of the SportsChannel networks that began that month, SportsChannel Ohio was rebranded as Fox Sports Ohio in January 1998.

The channel was then rebranded as Fox Sports Net Ohio in 2000, as part of a collective brand modification of the FSN networks under the "Fox Sports Net" banner; subsequently in 2004, the channel shortened its name to FSN Ohio, through the networks' de-emphasis of the brand.

In February 2005, News Corporation (which spun off most of its entertainment properties into 21st Century Fox in July 2013) acquired Cablevision's ownership stakes in Fox Sports Ohio and Fox Sports Florida, following an asset trade in which Fox sold its interest in Madison Square Garden, the Knicks and the Rangers, to Cablevision, in exchange for acquiring sole ownership of the two networks. The channel reverted to the Fox Sports Ohio moniker in 2008.

On December 14, 2017, as part of a merger between both companies, The Walt Disney Company announced plans to acquire all 22 regional Fox Sports networks from 21st Century Fox, including Fox Sports Ohio, sister network SportsTime Ohio, and Fox's 50% stake in the network's Cincinnati sub-feed. However, on June 27, 2018, the Justice Department ordered their divestment under antitrust grounds, citing Disney's ownership of ESPN. On May 3, 2019, Sinclair Broadcast Group and Entertainment Studios (through their joint venture, Diamond Holdings) bought Fox Sports Networks from The Walt Disney Company for $10.6 billion. The deal would also bring Fox Sports Ohio and SportsTime Ohio under common ownership with Sinclair stations WSYX/WTTE/WWHO in Columbus and WKRC-TV/WSTR-TV in Cincinnati, bringing possible synergies with those stations; Sinclair also owns or operates WNWO-TV in Toledo, WKEF/WRGT-TV in Dayton, WTOV-TV in Steubenville, Ohio and WCHS-TV/WVAH-TV in Charleston, West Virginia within Fox Sports Ohio/SportsTime Ohio's coverage area. On August 23, 2019, the deal was completed. On November 17, 2020, Sinclair announced an agreement with casino operator Bally's Corporation to serve as a new naming rights partner for the FSN channels. Sinclair announced the new Bally Sports branding for the channels on January 27, 2021.  On March 31, 2021, coinciding with the 2021 Major League Baseball season, Fox Sports Ohio and sister network SportsTime Ohio were rebranded as Bally Sports Ohio and Bally Sports Great Lakes, respectively, resulting in 18 other Regional Sports Networks renamed Bally Sports in their respective regions. On the rebranded regional network, the first live sporting event was the Reds home opener against the Cardinals on April 1. The game was preceded by the "Reds Live" pregame show.

On March 14, 2023, Diamond Sports filed for Chapter 11 Bankruptcy.

Feeds
The network operates regional feeds for the Cleveland and Cincinnati markets, both branded as Bally Sports Ohio (but with the latter feed disambiguated in some electronic program guides and online television listings services as "Bally Sports Cincinnati"), which broadcast different events depending on the market. This arrangement can cause event conflicts in the Columbus market, which is located between Cincinnati and Cleveland. In the event of conflicting events between the two regional feeds (typically between the Columbus Blue Jackets and Cleveland Cavaliers, the Blue Jackets and Cincinnati Reds, and the Reds and Cavaliers), cable providers in Central Ohio will carry the other game on an alternate channel.

Programming
Bally Sports Ohio holds the exclusive regional cable television rights to the NBA's Cleveland Cavaliers (since 1990), MLB's Cincinnati Reds (since 1991), the NHL's Columbus Blue Jackets (since 2000), Major League Soccer's Columbus Crew (since 2019), and a select number of the AHL's Cleveland Monsters games. The channel also carries a select number of college basketball games involving Northern Kentucky University and University of Dayton.

The channel formerly broadcast Cleveland Indians games from the network's launch as SportsChannel Ohio, until Fox Sports Ohio lost the rights as a result of the team starting (eventual sister channel) SportsTime Ohio in March 2006. Despite this move, Reds games continue to be blacked out in most of Northeast Ohio, the designated market area of the Indians. When Reds games air in the rest of Ohio, the Cleveland feed airs generic national Fox Sports Networks programming unless a local Cleveland event is scheduled. Although Fox Sports Ohio and STO came under common ownership following Fox's purchase of the latter in 2012, Fox Sports Ohio does not share broadcast rights to any sporting events with SportsTime Ohio and vice versa (unlike arrangements that exist between Fox Sports South and Fox Sports Southeast, and Fox Sports Florida and Fox Sports Sun), with both networks maintaining their own respective team television contracts. Starting in 2019, Columbus Crew games were split between Fox Sports Ohio and SportsTime Ohio, although those telecasts are blacked out in the Cincinnati area due to the presence of FC Cincinnati.

On October 19, 2016, Fox Sports and the Reds announced an extension of their broadcast agreement to the end of the 2032 season. The deal includes the Reds taking an equity stake in the Cincinnati sub-feed of Fox Sports Ohio.

Notable on-air staff

Current

Cincinnati Reds
 John Sadak - play-by-play
 Chris Welsh – primary color commentary/fill in co-host Reds Live
 Jeff Brantley – color commentary (select games)
 Barry Larkin – color commentary (home games)
 Jim Day – sideline reporter/Alternative play by play 
 Brian Giesenschlag – co-host Reds Live
 Sam LeCure – co-host Reds Live/ Cincinnati Reds color commentary (select games)
 Annie Sabo – Fill in co-host Reds Live

Cleveland Cavaliers
 John Michael - play-by-play
 Austin Carr - commentator
 Brad Daugherty - commentator
 Mike Fratello - commentator
 Cayleigh Griifin – pregame/halftime/postgame host
 Campy Russell – pregame/halftime/postgame analyst
 Serena Winters - sideline reporter

Columbus Blue Jackets
 Jeff Rimer – play-by-play
 Jody Shelley – sideline reporter/color commentary
 Dave Maetzold - in-game/locker room reporter
 Jean-Luc Grand-Pierre -  pregame/intermission/postgame (Blue Jackets Live) co-host
 Brian Giesenschlag – pregame/intermission/postgame (Blue Jackets Live) co-host

Columbus Crew
 Neil Sika – play-by-play
 Jordan Angeli – color commentary
 Brett Hiltbrand –  sideline reporter/pregame/halftime/postgame host (Crew Live)

College sports
 Dan Hoard - host for Bearcats Insider
 Terry Nelson – analyst for Bearcats Insider
 Tony Pike – analyst for Bearcats Insider
 John Cooper – analyst for Game Time with Ryan Day
 Jim Lachey – analyst for Game Time with Ryan Day
 Chris "Beanie" Wells – analyst for Game Time with Ryan Day

References

External links

 Official website
 

Television channels and stations established in 1989
Companies that filed for Chapter 11 bankruptcy in 2023
Fox Sports Networks
SportsChannel
1989 establishments in Ohio
Bally Sports